Dipteronia sinensis is a plant species in the genus Dipteronia, endemic to mainland China, and regarded in the soapberry family Sapindaceae sensu lato after Angiosperm Phylogeny Group (APG I 1998, APG II 2003) and more recently (Harrington et al. 2005)), or traditionally by several authors in Aceraceae, related to the maples.

Dipteronia sinensis is a deciduous flowering shrub or small tree, reaching 10–15 m tall.
The leaf arrangement is opposite and pinnate. The inflorescences are paniculate, terminal or axillary. The flowers have five sepals and petals; staminate flowers have eight stamens, and bisexual flowers have a two-celled ovary. The fruit is a rounded samara containing two compressed nutlets, flat, encircled by a broad wing which turns from light green to red with ripening.

Notes

References

 
 Li Shan, Qian Zengqiang, Cai Yuliang, and Zhao Guifang, "A comparison of the genetic diversity in Dipteronia sinensis Oliv. and Dipteronia dyeriana Henry", Frontiers of Biology in China, Volume 1, Number 4 / December, 2006, pages 381–388. ISSN 1673-3509 (Print), 1673-3622 (Online).
 Chinese Academy of Sciences. 1959–. Flora reipublicae popularis sinicae.
 Murray, A. E. 1970. A monograph of the Aceraceae. PhD diss., Pennsylvania State Univ.

Hippocastanoideae
Endemic flora of China
Plants described in 1889
Taxa named by Daniel Oliver